Angustibacter luteus is a bacterium from the genus of Angustibacter which has been isolated from subarctic forest soil.

References

External links
Type strain of Angustibacter luteus at BacDive -  the Bacterial Diversity Metadatabase

Bacteria described in 2010
Actinomycetia